secretprojectrevolution is a 2013 American short film directed by Madonna and Steven Klein, dealing with artistic freedom and human rights. The film launched a global initiative Art for Freedom to further freedom of expression, created by Madonna, curated by Vice and distributed by BitTorrent. The goal of Art for Freedom is to promote and facilitate free expression, and thereby hamper repression of artistic expression.

Synopsis
secretprojectrevolution is a 17-minute black-and-white film, with Madonna's off-camera commentary led throughout, consisting of a narrative recorded exclusively for the project as well as excerpts from her onstage speeches during The MDNA Tour.

It opens with a scene depicting Madonna locked in a prison cell, holding the bars. This is projected against a voice-over consisting of excerpts from her onstage speech at the Olympia in Paris, during The MDNA Tour in July 2012. The speech reflected on the economic situation in the world at that time, explaining that fear is the source of intolerance. The film then shows a pantomime, with the tour dancers sitting and standing still in a room, while Madonna enters holding a gun, which represents branding, and starts shooting them. This section ends with the words "All you need for a movie is a gun and a girl", a quote from Jean-Luc Godard, displayed across the screen.

The following scene shows Madonna being dragged by police officers to a cell, where she is thrown on the floor. By that point, her narrative starts, explaining the circumstances that prompted her to undertake the project. It continues for several minutes as the footage of Madonna in her cell alternates with scenes depicting a man being tortured by others, and a dancer performing routines. Madonna is then shown restrained on a bed, with a dancer teasing her and simulating torture. The following scene depicts an imprisoned man, who clearly had been a victim of a physical torture, with blood on his face and chest.

In the following segment, dancers start performing routines and adapting expressive poses as downtempo piano music plays and Madonna continues her narrative. An almost nude man dances in front of guards and Madonna's a cappella performance of "My Country, 'Tis of Thee" starts playing, followed by excerpts from her Saint Petersburg speech. The footage of Madonna killing the dancers is played backwards as they are brought back to life. Madonna is again shown being dragged by police officers who drop her on the floor and start looking down on her. This is followed by a quote "Freedom is what you do with what's been done to you" by Jean-Paul Sartre.

The film ends with a message: "This film is dedicated to those who have been persecuted, are being persecuted, or may be persecuted. For the color of their skin. Their religious beliefs. Their artistic expression. Their gender. Or their sexual preferences. Anyone whose human rights have been violated."

Production

Background
In late 2012, Madonna and Steven Klein were due to work together on a photo shoot for the promotional campaign of shoes and lingerie she had designed as part of her Truth or Dare collection. However, her products were met with unfavorable reception from the distributing company as being too provocative, what led to cancellation of the whole project. Instead, Madonna decided to use the set for filming the project with Klein and her dancers, using own-designed lingerie. The work began in Buenos Aires, Argentina in mid-December 2012, during Madonna's break between performances in the country. In the course of following weeks, the singer started to write the narration and more footage was produced.

The film was her artistic response to a series of social and political events which took place around the world while she was performing The MDNA Tour in the second half of 2012. These events included, among others, the threat of Israel striking Iran, the imprisonment of Yulia Tymoshenko in Ukraine and Pussy Riot in Russia, gay rights violations, presidential election in the United States and the attempted assassination of Malala Yousafzai. One of the scenes was inspired by the film The Night Porter, while another was inspired by the scene in the film noir Caged in which Eleanor Parker is jailed. Madonna has described secretprojectrevolution as one of the most important things she has ever done.

Development
On December 14, 2012, a picture taken on the set of the project surfaced online, sparking rumors that Madonna was allegedly working on her next music video, which many fans thought would be "Gang Bang". On December 19, Steven Klein first referred to the film as "#secretproject" on Twitter, what would serve as its official name. Later that month, he contacted the likes of Rihanna, Lady Gaga, Cher, Dita Von Teese, and Naomi Campbell on Twitter, inviting them to participate in the project. A picture saying "From Madonna to Rihanna 2 of 3" would emerge at the beginning of 2013, followed by a photograph of Naomi Campbell and Kate Moss, with a caption associating them with the project. More pictures from the set surfaced online, and Madonna started to post stills from the film and related pictures on Instagram in March 2013, attributed with a hashtag #secretproject, later modified to #secretprojectrevolution.

On March 20, Klein published first trailer of the film. In July, rumors started circulating that the project is actually a launch of the new clothing line, designed by Madonna's then-partner Brahim Zaibat.

Release
Initially announced for a May 12, 2013 release, the film was eventually premiered on September 23, in a series of eighteen outdoor screenings across five cities in four countries: New York, Los Angeles, Toronto, Berlin and London. The following day, secretprojectrevolution was released in the same form in Chicago, San Francisco, Rome, Paris and Tel Aviv, the latter added last minute as the final location. All locations had been revealed shortly before events via Madonna's social media profiles. On September 24, the full film was uploaded onto YouTube and released via a new BitTorrent-based feature called Bundle, consisting of unlocked trailers and stills, plus three videos and a written message from Madonna, all locked but unlockable by submitting a valid email address. BitTorrent claims that BitTorrent Bundle is still an alpha-stage project. It is a proprietary format for distributing locked content along with a virtual storefront that presents consumers with ways that the artist has chosen to enable content unlocking, which can vary.

During a screening in New York's Gagosian Gallery, Madonna made a personal appearance at the event, preceding the projection with a speech and following it with a live performance of Elliott Smith's "Between the Bars", accompanied by her son Rocco Ritchie as a dancer. Meanwhile, a 40-minute interview was uploaded onto YouTube, conducted in London by Vice'''s Eddy Moretti, in which Madonna explains the circumstances that prompted her to realize the whole project.

Reception and aftermath
Despite Madonna's limited personal appearances to promote the project as well as its non-commercial nature, secretprojectrevolution was met with a respectable amount of media coverage and public interest, although the reviews it received were mixed. An estimated ten thousand people watched the film across all screenings. In less than three weeks, the Bundle has been downloaded over 1.2m times and as of October 2013, tens of works were being submitted every day on the Art for Freedom website.

British singer-songwriter and activist Kate Nash announced working on her own "secret project" in August 2013, inviting fans to collaborate. She would later adapt Madonna's approach for her UK Street Teams project in October 2013, organizing group meet ups on previously announced locations. The music video for Lady Gaga's duet with R. Kelly "Do What U Want" was reported to be released on BitTorrent in December 2013, in collaboration with Vice. Although secretprojectrevolution never officially premiered in Poland, the Official Madonna Fanclub in Poland organized a screening of the film in Cracow in December 2013.

Simultaneously with the release of the film, the Art for Freedom program was initiated, allowing artists to upload their own works expressing their personal definition of freedom and revolution on the artforfreedom.com website. A one-year-long grants program was launched in October, in support of individuals and organizations working to advance social justice. Every month, Madonna and a guest curator choose a winning submission and award $10,000 to a nonprofit organization or project of the winning artist's choice. The first guest curator was Anthony Kiedis of the Red Hot Chili Peppers.

On October 8, 2013, Madonna hosted first ever live art curation on Twitter, followed by another curation on Tumblr on November 13, 2013. Meanwhile, screenings of secretprojectrevolution'' took place in Jericho and Rio de Janeiro, on October 11 and 20, respectively. In November, an Art for Freedom-themed design overlay pack was released through a graphic design application Studio. In early January 2014, Katy Perry became a guest curator of Art for Freedom, followed by Miley Cyrus in early April. A live art curation took place on BuzzFeed on April 15, 2014.

Screening dates

References

External links
Download the film
 secretprojectrevolution on YouTube
 How Madonna is Changing the World with Art For Freedom

2013 films
2013 short films
American short films
American black-and-white films
Films about freedom of expression
Films directed by Madonna
2010s English-language films